Karl Ameisbichler (born 25 March 1927) was an Austrian boxer. He competed in the men's heavyweight event at the 1948 Summer Olympics.

References

External links
 

1927 births
Possibly living people
Austrian male boxers
Olympic boxers of Austria
Boxers at the 1948 Summer Olympics
Sportspeople from Klagenfurt
Heavyweight boxers